Gerrardanthus macrorhizus, also known as bigfoot, is a species of plant native to southern Africa. It is a popular pot plant.

References 

Garden plants of Africa
Caudiciform plants
Plants described in 1867
Cucurbitaceae
Taxa named by Joseph Dalton Hooker